The 2009 Masters was a professional non-ranking snooker tournament that took place between 11 and 18 January 2009 at the Wembley Arena in London, England.

Ronnie O'Sullivan won  his 4th Masters title by beating defending champion Mark Selby 10–8 in the final.

The quarter-final match between Stephen Maguire and Neil Robertson featured 5 consecutive century breaks between the two players: 3 from Maguire and 2 from Robertson. This is a joint record for a professional match and a standalone record for a best-of-11 frame match.

Field
Defending champion Mark Selby was the number 1 seed with World Champion Ronnie O'Sullivan seeded 2. Places were allocated to the top 16 players in the world rankings. Players seeded 15 and 16 played in the wild-card round against the winner of the qualifying event, Judd Trump (ranked 41), and wild-card selection Ricky Walden (ranked 35). Mark Allen, Judd Trump and Ricky Walden were making their debuts in the Masters.

Prize fund
The breakdown of prize money for this year is shown below:

Qualifying stage
Winner: £2,000
Runner-up: £680
Semi-final: £250
Quarter-final: £105
Total: £1,600

Television stage

Winner: £150,000
Runner-up: £75,000
Semi-final: £32,000
Quarter-final: £16,000
Last 16: £14,000
Last 18 (wild-cards): £3,500

Highest break: £10,000
Maximum break: £25,000
Total: £482,000

Wild-card round

In the preliminary round, the wild-card players plays the 15th and 16th seeds.

Main draw

Final

Qualifying
The 2008 Masters Qualifying Event was held between 21 and 26 November 2008 at the English Institute of Sport in Sheffield. The winner was awarded with a wild-card to the 2009 Masters.

Century breaks

Televised stage centuries
Total: 31

 140, 127, 100  John Higgins
 136, 128, 118, 115, 110, 102, 101, 100  Ronnie O'Sullivan
 130, 124  Ali Carter
 128, 114, 113, 105  Stephen Maguire
 123  Judd Trump
 122, 100  Neil Robertson

 120, 114, 104, 102, 101, 100  Mark Selby
 119, 104  Mark Allen
 115  Mark King
 106  Graeme Dott
 105  Joe Perry

Judd Trump's and Mark King's centuries were scored in the wild-card round.

Qualifying stage centuries

 138, 129, 120  Judd Trump
 136  Ricky Walden
 132  Andrew Higginson
 125  Mark Joyce
 125  Jin Long
 124, 120, 100  Jamie Cope
 121  Kuldesh Johal

 118  Ian McCulloch
 115, 101  Matthew Stevens
 114  David Roe
 109  Matthew Selt
 109  Joe Swail
 100  Andy Hicks

References

Masters (snooker)
Masters Snooker 2009
Masters (snooker)
Masters (snooker)
Masters (snooker)